Geir Jørgen Bekkevold (born 19 November 1963) is a Norwegian priest and politician for the Christian Democratic Party.

He was born in Horten as a son of laborer Jan Egil Bekkevold and housewife Evy Bekkevold. He finished his secondary education in Horten in 1982, and attended the University of Oslo from 1983 to 1991. Here, he received the cand.theol. degree as well as undergoing the practical-theological seminary. He worked as a field priest during his compulsory military service from 1991 to 1992, and then became curate in Gjerpen. In 2005 he was promoted to vicar in Borgestad in Skien.

Bekkevold became involved in politics as a member of Skien city council from 1999 to 2009, the last two years in the executive committee. From 2003 to 2007 he was also a member of Telemark county council. He chaired the local chapter from his party from 2007 to 2008, and the regional chapter in Telemark from 2008. He was elected to the Parliament of Norway from Telemark in 2009. He became a member of the Standing Committee on Local Government and Public Administration, Like his entire party group, he also joined Israels Venner på Stortinget.

Bekkevold has also been active in YMCA/YWCA locally. He was a board member of Teater Ibsen from 2004 to 2008, and the county library from 2007. In 2020, Bekkevold became chair of the board for UWC Red Cross Nordic in Fjaler, Norway.

References

1963 births
Living people
Members of the Storting
Politicians from Telemark
Christian Democratic Party (Norway) politicians
Norwegian priest-politicians
University of Oslo alumni
People from Horten
Politicians from Skien
21st-century Norwegian politicians